It's Christmas, Carol!, a 2012 adaptation of Charles Dickens' 1843 novella A Christmas Carol, premiered on the Hallmark Channel on November 18, 2012. The film stars Emmanuelle Vaugier, Carrie Fisher, and Carson Kressley.

Plot
Carol, a bitter workaholic Chief executive officer, gets a wake up call from her deceased boss and predecessor Eve. Eve appears as the three different ghosts of Christmas (Past, Present, and Future) due to budget cuts in the afterlife. In the end, Carol realizes what she'd lost over the years and changes her ways.

Cast
 Emmanuelle Vaugier as Carol
 Carrie Fisher as Eve
 Carson Kressley as Fred

See also
 Adaptations of A Christmas Carol
 List of Christmas films

References

External links

2012 television films
2012 films
American Christmas films
Christmas television films
Television shows based on A Christmas Carol
Films based on A Christmas Carol
Hallmark Channel original films